Christine Bardelle (born 16 August 1974) is a French long-distance runner.

In cross-country, Christine Bardelle's French team won the team silver medal  at the 2012 European Cross Country Championships and 2013 European Cross Country Championships, and also obtained the team bronze medal at the 2008 European Cross Country Championships.

On the Track, Christine won the  5000 metres title at the championships of  France 2006, 2009 et 2012, and won the national title in the 10 000 metres in 2010. Elle placed seventh in the 3000 metres at the  2013 Indoor European Championships and won this same year the gold medal in 5000 m at the 2013 Mediterranean Games.

Achievements

References

External links

1974 births
Living people
People from Provins
French female long-distance runners
Sportspeople from Seine-et-Marne
Mediterranean Games gold medalists for France
Mediterranean Games medalists in athletics
Athletes (track and field) at the 2013 Mediterranean Games
21st-century French women